Pakosław may refer to the following places:
Pakosław, Nowy Tomyśl County in Greater Poland Voivodeship (west-central Poland)
Pakosław, Rawicz County in Greater Poland Voivodeship (west-central Poland)
Pakosław, Masovian Voivodeship (east-central Poland)
Pakosław, West Pomeranian Voivodeship (north-west Poland)